Brian Attebery (born December 1951) is an American writer and emeritus professor of English and philosophy at Idaho State University. He is known for his studies of fantasy literature, including The Fantasy Tradition in American Literature: From Irving to Le Guin (1980) and Strategies of Fantasy (1992) which won the Mythopoeic Award. Attebery is also editor of the Journal of the Fantastic in the Arts, for which he received the World Fantasy Award in 2021. He has also won the IAFA Award for distinguished scholarship and the Pilgrim Award for lifetime achievement.

Biography
Attebery was born in December 1951, and received a doctorate in American Civilization from Brown University in 1979. He is professor of English at Idaho State University, and the editor of the Journal of the Fantastic in the Arts. He is known for his non-fiction works on fantasy literature, such as the 1980 book The Fantasy Tradition in American Literature: From Irving to Le Guin and the 1992 book Strategies of Fantasy. Attebery suggests that fantasy is a "fuzzy set" with no easily discernible boundaries, in contrast to the genre of science fiction. Critic John Clute has praised the book as displaying "very considerable  [...] critical acumen".

He retired from Idaho State University in April 2022 and was named an emeritus professor in the Department of English and Philosophy.

Recognition

Career awards 
Attebery is the recipient of the 1993 IAFA Award for Distinguished Scholarship, and the 2009 Pilgrim Award for lifetime contribution to SF and fantasy scholarship.

Individual works 
He has also won the Mythopoeic Award and World Fantasy Award for individual works of nonfiction, as detailed in the following table.

Works

Short fiction 

 "Fairest", Strange Horizons.com (September 11, 2006)

Non-fiction 

 The Fantasy Tradition in American Literature: From Irving to Le Guin (1980)
 Strategies of Fantasy (1992)
 Decoding Gender in Science Fiction (2002)
 Parabolas of Science Fiction (2013) editor with Veronica Hollinger
 Stories about Stories: Fantasy & the Remaking of Myth (2014)
 Fantasy: How It Works (2022)

Anthologies as editor 
 The Norton Book of Science Fiction: North American Science Fiction, 1960-1990 (1993) editor with Ursula K. Le Guin
 Reading Narrative Fiction (1993) editor; written by Seymour Chatman
 Le Guin: Hainish Novels and Stories, Volume 1 (2017) editor, Library of America
 Le Guin: Hainish Novels and Stories, Volume 2 (2017) editor, Library of America

Essays 

 Fantasy as an Anti-Utopian Mode (1986)
 Women's Coming of Age in Fantasy (1987)
 Science Fantasy and Myth (1987)
 Tolkien, Crowley, and Postmodernism (1990)
 Fantasy and the Narrative Transaction (1992)
 Godmaking in the Heartland: The Backgrounds of Orson Scott Card's American Fantasy (1992)
 Response to John Kessel's "The Brother from Another Planet" (1993)
 Letter (NYRSF, May 1993) (1993)
 Review: Peake Studies by G. Peter Wilnnington (1994)
 The 1995 James Tiptree, Jr Memorial Award Shortlist (1995) with Ellen Kushner and Pat Murphy and Susanna J. Sturgis and Lucy Sussex
 The Politics (If Any) of Fantasy (1995)
 The Closing of the Final Frontier: Science Fiction After 1960 (1995)
 Androgyny and Difference in Science Fiction (1997)
 Science Fiction and the Gender of Knowledge (2000)
 Myth and History: Molly Gloss's Wild Life and Alan Garner's Strandloper (2001)
 "But Aren't Those Just... You Know, Metaphors?": Postmodern Figuration in the Science Fiction of James Morrow and Gwyneth Jones (2002)
 The Magazine Era: 1926-1960 (2003)
 Science Fiction, Parables, and Parabolas (2005)
 High Church versus Broad Church: Christian Myth in George MacDonald and C. S. Lewis (2005)
 The Conquest of Gernsback: Leslie F. Stone and the Subversion of Science Fiction Troupes (2006)
 Special Section (Extrapolation, Spring 2009) (2009)
 C. L. Moore (1911-87) (2009)
 The Nobies' Story (2010)
 Science Fiction Parabolas: Jazz, Geometry, and Generation Starships (2013)
 The Fantastic (2014)
 Introduction: Messages from an Alternate Reality (2020)

Notes

References

External links
 
 Brian Attebery at The Encyclopedia of Science Fiction

American science fiction writers
Science fiction academics
Science fiction critics
American speculative fiction critics
Living people
Brown University alumni
Idaho State University faculty
American academics of English literature
1951 births
American male novelists
American male non-fiction writers